"Burning Down the House" is a 1983 song by Talking Heads.

Burning Down the House or Burnin' Down the House may also refer to:

 House fire

Music
 Burnin' Down the House: Live at the House of Blues, 2003 blues album by Etta James
 Burnin Down The House, 2005 rap album by Canibus
 "Burnin Down the House", 2006 song on the album Villebillies by Villebillies
 "Burn the House Down", 2018 single by AJR

Television
 "Burnin' Down the House", episode of the 1986–93 series The Judge
 "Burning Down the House", 1992 episode in season 3 of Northern Exposure
 "Burnin' Down the House" (The Fresh Brince of Bel-Air), 1995 season 6 episode
 "Burnin' Down the House", 1995 2-part episode in season 7 of Wings
 "Burning Down the House" (That '70s Show episode), 2000 season 2 episode
 "Burning Down the House", 2004 episode in season 9 of The Drew Carey Show
 "Burning Down the House", 2005 episode of Flip This House
 "Burning Down the House", 2008 episode in season 3 of The New Adventures of Old Christine
 "Burning Down the House", 2011 episode in season 2 of I'm in the Band
 "Burning Down the House", 2011 episode in season 4 of True Blood
 "Burning Down the House", 2011 episode in season 2 of Rizzoli & Isles

Film
 Burning Down the House (film), a 2001 film directed by Philippe Mora

Literature
 Burning Down the House: Fighting Fires and Losing Myself, a 2009 memoir by Russell Wangersky
 Burning Down the House (novel), a 2016 novel by Jane Mendelsohn

See also
 Bringing Down the House (disambiguation)